was a statesman, politician and cabinet minister in Taishō and early Shōwa period Japan.

Biography
Mizuno was the son of a samurai in the service of Akita Domain, and was born at the Akita Domain’s Edo residence in what is now the Asakusa area of Tokyo. He was a graduate of the law school of Tokyo Imperial University in 1892, where one of his classmates was future Prime Minister Wakatsuki Reijirō. Hozumi Nobushige introduced Mizuno to Shibusawa Eiichi, who offered him a position at his bank: however, Mizuno accepted Ume Kenjirō’s offer of an introduction to the Minister of Agriculture & Commerce and opted for a career as a government bureaucrat instead. In 1894, he changed to the Home Ministry, working initially for the Bureau of Mines, and subsequently serving in numerous other roles.

He was one of the Japanese delegates to the Berne Convention for the Protection of Literary and Artistic Works in Switzerland, which resulted in the promulgation of the initial version of the Copyright law of Japan in 1899.

By the invitation of Hara Takashi, Mizuno joined the Rikken Seiyūkai and was appointed to the upper house of the Diet of Japan. Under the administration of Prime Minister Terauchi Masatake, he was appointed to the Cabinet as Home Minister for the first time.

From 1919 to 1922, Mizuno served as Parliamentary Commissioner of the Governor-General of Korea, a post which was effectively the head of the civilian administration of Korea under Japanese rule. Mizuno was regarded as particularly suited for this role, as he was familiar with the security apparatus for monitoring Korean residents in Japan and had experience in the suppression of civil disturbance due to his term as Home Minister during the Rice Riots of 1918. During his tenure in Korea, he greatly expanded the telephone infrastructure of the country, which had economic as well as security benefits, On December 25, 1920 Mizuno was awarded the Grand Cordon of the Order of the Rising Sun.

Mizuno returned to the Cabinet as Home Minister again under the Katō administration from 1922 to 1923, turning the post over to Gotō Shinpei the day after the 1923 Great Kantō earthquake.

After the Great Kantō earthquake, Mizuno is infamous for causing anti-Korean sentiments by falsely accusing Koreans the crimes they did not cause, such as poisoning the well. This caused an indiscriminate genocide of Koreans. Almost 6,000 Koreans were slaughtered by Japanese civil militias. The civil militias ruthlessly murdered Koreans or Chinese who were wearing Korean and Chinese traditional clothes. When they discovered Koreans or Chinese wearing Japanese clothes, the civil militias required them to pronounce "十五円五十銭(Fifteen Yen Fifty Bucks, じゅうごえんごじっせん)," which is especially hard for Koreans to pronounce. As a result many Koreans, plus Chinese, Ryukyuan people, Japanese people from Hokkaido or rural places, and many others who failed to pronounce them correctly were brutally slaughtered.

At the end of 1923, after the Toranomon Incident, he was requested to return to the Cabinet as Home Minister for a third time, under the Keigo administration.

From 1927 to 1928, Mizuno served as Minister of Education. As Education Minister, he took steps to purge leftist professors from Japan's imperial universities and to ban radical leftist student groups.

In 1928, Prime Minister Tanaka Giichi attempted to appoint his close friend Fusanosuke Kuhara, a businessman noted for his radical right-wing politics and first-year member of the Diet to the post of Home Minister. Mizuno resigned in protest, which should have brought down Tanaka’s Cabinet. However, Tanaka brought Mizuno a message from Emperor Hirohito asking Mizuno to withdraw his resignation. The incident caused an uproar in the House of Peers and threatened to precipitate a constitutional crisis, as this would mean that the Emperor was violating a long-standing rule of not interfering directly in politics and the action was perceived to be favorable to the Rikken Seiyūkai over their rivals, the Rikken Minseitō. Mizuno was forced to resign once again, and Tanaka fell increasingly out of favor with the Emperor; the incident was a major force in driving Tanaka from office in 1929.

In his later years, Mizuno served as chairman of the Japanese Society for Rights of Authors, Composers and Publishers, and other posts. On 17 April 1938, Mizuno was awarded the Order of the Paulownia Flowers. At the end of World War II he was arrested by the Allied occupation forces and held in Sugamo Prison for Class-A war criminal charges for his position as honorary vice-chairman of the Dai-Nippon Koa Domei (Japan Pan-Asian Alliance), a war-time nationalist society, but was released on 1 September 1947 without coming to trial. He died on 25 November 1949 at the age of 81.

Notes

References
 Bix, Herbert P. Hirohito and the Making of Modern Japan. Harper Perennial (2001). . 
Yang, Daqing. Technology of Empire: Telecommunications and Japanese Expansion in Asia, 1883-1945. Harvard University Asia Center (2011) 
 Marshall, Bryan. Academic Freedom and the Japanese Imperial University, 1868-1939. University of California Press (1992) 
 Weiner, Michael. Race and Migration in Japan. Routledge
 Yamagami Kazuo.  Konoe Fumimaro And the Failure of Peace in Japan, 1937-1941: A Critical Appraisal Of The Three-time Prime Minister. Mcfarland & Co Inc (2006). . Page 22

External links

Mizuno Rentaro Museum home page

 

1868 births
1949 deaths
University of Tokyo alumni
Members of the House of Peers (Japan)
Rikken Seiyūkai politicians
20th-century Japanese politicians
Government ministers of Japan
Education ministers of Japan
Ministers of Home Affairs of Japan
Recipients of the Order of the Paulownia Flowers
Grand Cordons of the Order of the Rising Sun